Tonya Suzanne Holly (born 2 July 1962 in Red Bay, Alabama) is a casting director who studied theater at University of North Alabama.

Holly is a TV and film producer with more than 20 year experience in the film industry where she have worked on movies such as the 1991 movie Toy Soldiers and she did also the casting of “Blue Sky”. Holly has worked with CBS, HBO, NBC, FOX, Morgan Creek, Universal, Buena Vista, and other productions.

Alabama Filmmakers Association 
Holly also founded the Alabama Filmmakers Association  in 1991 to help promote film in the state of Alabama.

Cypress Moon Studios 

Holy is the owner and president of Cypress Moon Studios located in the earlier buildings of Muscle Shoals Sound Studio in Sheffield, Alabama

Movies in developments 
The latest work directed by Holly is "Sleeping Giants: The Union of the Seven" and the shooting of the new 2012 movie about Bonnie and Clyde named The Story of Bonnie and Clyde starring Sean Faris as Clyde Barrow and Lindsay Pulsipher as Bonnie Parker. The casting of the movie was delayed and was dealt a major setback in April 2011 as tornadoes damaged or destroyed film locations in Mississippi and Alabama where flooding prevented filming at the state prison in Angola.

Movies directed by Tonya Holly 
 When I Find the Ocean
 The Mirror
 The Story of Bonnie and Clyde (in production)
 ''Sleeping Giants: The Union of the Seven (in production)

References 

American casting directors
Women casting directors
Living people
1962 births
People from Red Bay, Alabama
Film directors from Alabama